Translin is a DNA-binding protein that in humans is encoded by the TSN gene. Together with translin-associated factor X, translin forms the component 3 of promoter of RISC (C3PO) complex which facilitates endonucleolytic cleavage of the passenger strand during microRNA loading into the RNA-induced silencing complex (RISC).

Function 

This gene encodes a DNA-binding protein which specifically recognizes conserved target sequences at the breakpoint junction of chromosomal translocations. Translin polypeptides form a multimeric structure that is responsible for its DNA-binding activity. Recombination-associated motifs and translin-binding sites are present at recombination hotspots and may serve as indicators of breakpoints in genes which are fused by translocations. These binding activities may play a crucial role in chromosomal translocation in lymphoid neoplasms.

Interactions 

Translin has been shown to interact with PPP1R15A.

References

Further reading

External links